is a Japanese voice actress known for her role as Hercule Barton in Tantei Opera Milky Holmes, and her other major roles include Himeno Katsuragi in Da Capo III, Kuguru Uki in Future Card Buddyfight, and Neko in Recently, My Sister Is Unusual. Sasaki was chosen from thousands of people who auditioned for roles in Milky Holmes. She is a member of the singer group Milky Holmes, formed by the four main voice actresses in Tantei Opera Milky Holmes. In a recent YouTube video on her shared channel, she has stated that she would like for her display photo on Wikipedia to be changed to a more recent one.

Career 
On April 10, 2020, Sasaki, Aimi, and Ayasa Itō started their own YouTube channel under the name of the Three Voice Acting Sisters [Team Y]. In a video posted in October 2020, Sasaki and the two others stated that they wished for their YouTube channel to be detailed in their Wikipedia pages.

Filmography

Anime television series
 Tantei Opera Milky Holmes (2010), Hercule Barton
 Tantei Opera Milky Holmes: Act 2 (2012), Hercule Barton
 Muv-Luv Alternative: Total Eclipse (2012), Natasha Ivanova
 Outbreak Company (2013), Kusako El
 Da Capo III (2013), Himeno Katsuragi
 Futari wa Milky Holmes (2013), Hercule Barton
 Cardfight!! Vanguard G (2014), Kumi Okazaki
 Recently, My Sister Is Unusual (2014), Neko
 Future Card Buddyfight (2014), Kuguru Uki
 Tantei Opera Milky Holmes TD (2015), Hercule Barton
 Etotama (2015), Piyotan
 PriPara (2015), Reika
 Nazotokine (2016), Natsuko Yanagisawa
 Show by Rock!!# (2016), Candy Lapin
 Kemono Friends (2017) Royal penguin (eps. 1 - 10, 12), Tasmanian Devil (ep. 2)
 Hulaing Babies (2019), Fumi
 Hulaing Babies☆Petit (2020), Fumi
 Rebirth (2020), Kurumi
 Teppen!!!!!!!!!!!!!!! Laughing 'til You Cry (2022), Yuzu Hosono
 Peter Grill and the Philosopher's Time: Super Extra (2022), Gobco Ngière

Anime films
 Neppu Kairiku Bushi Road (2013), Rin

OVAs
 Shiba Inuko-san (2012), Shiba Inuko-san
 Kamisama Kiss (2013)

Video Games
Revue Starlight Re LIVE (2018-2019), Shizuha Kochō

Drama CDs
 Chatting at the Amber Teahouse (2011), customer
 Girl Friends (2011), Mariko Kumakura
 Tantei Opera Milky Holmes (2011), Hercule Barton

References

External links
Official blog 
Official agency profile 

1991 births
Living people
Voice actresses from Iwate Prefecture
Japanese video game actresses
Japanese voice actresses
21st-century Japanese singers
21st-century Japanese women singers
21st-century Japanese actresses
Anime singers
Milky Holmes members